= Ishan Ganda =

Indian cricketer (born 1981)

Personal information
- Born: 30 December 1981 (age 44); Sirsa, Haryana, India
- Role: Batting Allrounder
- Source: Cricinfo, 13 November 2025

Ishan Ganda (born 30 December 1981) is an Indian former cricketer. He played first-class cricket for Haryana Ranji Cricket team between 1997 and 2005.
